Denver City High School is a public high school located in Denver City, Texas and classified as a 3A school by the UIL.  It is part of the Denver City Independent School District located in southern Yoakum County.  In 2013, the school was rated "Met Standard" by the Texas Education Agency.

History
DCHS has been a Texas Education Agency Recognized Campus and was a United States Department of Education Blue Ribbon School in 2007. They have excelled in football, basketball, golf, tennis, track, baseball, softball, and volleyball. The UIL Academic team has won two consecutive district championships and won the UIL region I championship in 2011.

The school has an outstanding fine arts department with championships in band, theatre, colorguard and art. The school is widely recognized for its Career and technology programs including award-winning agriculture, automotive technology and industrial arts programs.

The school district is in the middle of a $600 million construction, of a new highschool. Where it will have a new bandhall, a new theater and new classroom for the teachers and students.

Athletics
Denver City High School participates in cross country, football, volleyball, basketball, powerlifting, golf, tennis, colorguard, track, baseball and softball.

State titles
Football 
1960(2A)

State finalists
Boys Basketball 
1953 (1A)
Volleyball 
1972 (2A), 1973 (2A), 1976 (2A)

Band
UIL Marching Band State Champions 
1983 (3A), 1985 (3A), 1986 (3A), 1988 (3A), 1989 (3A)

Theater
One Act Play 
1971 (2A)

References

External links
Denver City Independent School District

Schools in Yoakum County, Texas
Public high schools in Texas